The term/acronym KPL may refer to:

People
 Kevin Pierre-Louis (born 1991), American football player

Libraries
 Kalamazoo Public Library, district library in Kalamazoo, Michigan
 Kewanee Public Library, National Register of Historic Places listings in Henry County, Illinois
 Kitchener Public Library, public library system for the city of Kitchener, Ontario

Organizations
 Kappa Phi Lambda, Asian American sorority
 Khaosan Pathet Lao, the Lao News Agency
 Korean Peasants League, NGO whose members are South Korean farmers
 Körber PaperLink, in Hamburg, Germany, holding company for the Körber Group's Paper Division
 Communist Party of Luxembourg, communist political party in Luxembourg

Sports
 Karnataka Premier League, Indian Twenty20 cricket league
 Kazakhstan Premier League, top division football league in Kazakhstan
 Kenyan Premier League, top division football league in Kenya
 Kerala Premier League, Indian Football league in Kerala
 Kashmir Premier League (Pakistan), 20-over cricket league in Pakistan
 Kashmir Premier League (India), 20-over cricket league in India

Other uses
 Kilometers per liter, a form of fuel efficiency